Half Moon Caye Lighthouse is a lighthouse on the Half Moon Caye located in the Lighthouse Reef in Belize.

History
The station was originally established in 1820, the lighthouse was formed by a skeletal tower restored in 1848 and reinforced with a steel frame in 1931. In the  latest years the lighthouse moved progressively toward the water because the trend in the weather change. The lighthouse was deactivated in 1997 and from then begun to wreck. A new skeletal tower was built in 1998 inland respect to the former light, it is equipped with a beacon which emits four white flashes every 10 seconds. In September 2010 the Tropical Storm Matthew destroyed completely the old lighthouse.

See also
 List of lighthouses in Belize

References

External links

 Belize Port Authority

Lighthouses in Belize
Lighthouses completed in 1820
Lighthouses completed in 1931